Chemistry Building may refer to:

Gilman Hall, long known as the Chemistry Building, home of University of California at Berkeley College of Chemistry
Old Main and Chemistry Building at Widener University
Seeley G. Mudd Chemistry Building at Vassar College
University of Arkansas Chemistry Building
University of Melbourne Chemistry Building